Montague is the fourth release by Swedish hip hop group Hov1 but their first mixtape. The mixtape was released on 10 January 2020 on streaming services as well as a digital download. It serves as the group's fourth number one "album" on the Swedish Albums Chart, where it debuted at that position. The mixtape is also the second of Hov1's albums to chart on the Finnish Albums Chart, where it placed at number 40. As previous releases, the mixtape was mainly produced by the group's producer and member Axel Liljefors Jansson, while all members share writing credits on all tracks. Jens Resch Thomason helped with producing two tracks on the Mixtape: "Mitten av september" and "Brev ifrån en storstad". On the track "Kära Mamma", Swedish singer-songwriter Veronica Maggio is featured as both a songwriter and background vocalist. It markes the second collaboration between the group and the singer, with the first being the track "Horntullsstrand" on the group's third studio album, Vindar på Mars.

Critical reception 

Montague did not receive much attention from Swedish music critics at its release, but Dagens Nyheters reviewer Mattias Dahlström gave the Mixtape an overall negative review, calling the Mixtape "tone-deaf" and too reliable on "streaming service" tracks. However, he highlighted the track "Svartsjuk" as the Mixtape's best and stated that the Mixtape, at times, expresses "charming, youthful enthusiasm."

Track listing
Adapted from Tidal.

Charts

Weekly charts

Year-end charts

Release history

Notes

References

2020 mixtape albums
Hip hop albums by Swedish artists
Universal Music AB albums
Swedish-language albums